Mozambique competed at the 2010 Summer Youth Olympics, the inaugural Youth Olympic Games, held in Singapore from 14 August to 26 August 2010.

Athletics

Boys
Track and Road Events

Girls
Track and Road Events

Swimming

References

External links
Competitors List: Mozambique – Singapore 2010 official site

You
Nations at the 2010 Summer Youth Olympics
Mozambique at the Youth Olympics